Ezio Carabella (3 March 1891 in Rome – 19 April 1964 in Rome) was an Italian operetta, song and film music composer. He provided music for several films directed by Mario Camerini, among others. He was the father of the actress Flora Carabella.

Selected filmography
 Lowered Sails (1931)
 The Last Adventure (1932)
 Fanny (1933)
 Like the Leaves (1935)
 The Phantom Gondola (1936)
 King of Diamonds (1936)
 Mad Animals (1939)
 It Always Ends That Way (1939)
 Then We'll Get a Divorce (1940)
 The Last Dance (1941)
 Two Hearts Among the Beasts (1943)
 Short Circuit (1943)
 The Son of the Red Corsair (1943)
 Life Begins Anew (1945)
 The Ten Commandments (1945)
 The Opium Den (1947)
 The White Devil (1947)
 Baron Carlo Mazza (1948)
 Four Red Roses (1951)
 Son of the Hunchback (1952)
 Loving You Is My Sin (1953)
 The King's Prisoner (1954)
 The Mysteries of Paris (1957)

References

1891 births
1964 deaths
Musicians from Rome
Italian film score composers
Italian male film score composers
Italian opera composers
Male opera composers
20th-century Italian composers
20th-century Italian male musicians